"California Love" is a song by American rapper 2Pac featuring fellow American rapper-producer Dr. Dre and American singer Roger Troutman. The song was released as 2Pac's comeback single after his release from prison in 1995 and was his first single as the newest artist of Death Row Records. The remix is featured on the UK version of his fourth album, All Eyez on Me (1996), and is one of 2Pac's most widely known and most successful singles. It reached number one on the Billboard Hot 100 for two weeks (as a double A-side single with "How Do U Want It") and also topped the charts of Italy, New Zealand, and Sweden. The song was posthumously nominated Grammy Award for Best Rap Performance by a Duo or Group in 1997.

Original version
The original version was not available on any of Shakur's studio albums due to it being intended for Dr. Dre's shelved album The Chronic II: A New World Odor (Poppa's Got A Brand New Funk), but it can now be found on Shakur's compilation of Greatest Hits and on the United Kingdom version of All Eyez on Me. The original version also exists in extended form and is 6:29 in length. This particular version was never released to the public and is now only available on 12-inch promo vinyl records. Aside from the extended track being on limited quantities of vinyl promo records, very few uploads to YouTube exist of the original, 6:29-length extended song, performed without Shakur.

Writing, samples and background
"California Love" was one of two songs produced by Dr. Dre on All Eyez on Me—the other one being "Can't C Me". The first version of the song has three verses featuring Dr. Dre's rapping. The only copy of this session is now in the possession of DJ Jam, Snoop Dogg's personal concert DJ. 2Pac first heard Dr. Dre's session while at Dre's in-house studio and asked Dre to put him on the song. Producer Laylaw also did an additional remix of the song which is often erroneously credited to Dr. Dre and has been suggested to be one of the reasons for the fallout between Dre and 2Pac a few months later. The original was released as a double-A side single together with "How Do U Want It" and intended for the Dr. Dre album The Chronic II, while the remix was included on 2Pac's All Eyez on Me. The song was made and written in Dr. Dre's in house studio, 2Pac came in and wrote his verse straight away; it took him just 15 minutes to write his verse. The weekend after the song was completed the video was then recorded.

The original version contains a sample taken from Joe Cocker's 1972 song "Woman to Woman".
The remix version contains a sample taken from Kleeer's 1984 song "Intimate Connection".
The chorus, "California knows how to party", was sung by Roger Troutman using his characteristic talk box and was taken from the 1982 song "West Coast Poplock" by Ronnie Hudson & The Street People which was written by Ronnie Hudson and Mikel Hooks. 
In the song where Troutman sings "shake it, shake it baby", he interpolates the chant he used on his 1982 Zapp single, "Dance Floor".

Critical reception 
Michael Hill from Cash Box noted that 2Pac and Dr Dre "are clicking some smooth lyrics together over this killer a— dance track. This track is smoking, and with the introduction of funk royalty Roger Troutman on the vocoder, it simply bursts into flames. If you haven’t heard one of the six mixes available, be patient because it’s bound to reach your area soon." Will Hermes from Entertainment Weekly viewed it as "a West Coast rump shaker". Ralph Tee from Music Week RM Dance Update rated the song four out of five, describing it as "a fusion of funk and hip hop on this excellent rap cut about the splendour of the US's sunshine state." He added further, "Dr Dre's production sparkles on this potential hit which takes the vocoder and horns from Zapp's 'So Ruff So Tuff' (Roger Troutman also appearing in the Mad Max-style video) and on its best mix the sticky bassline from Kleeer's 'Intimate Connection' underlines it all."

Music videos 
Two versions of the music video were filmed. Shakur's longtime friend actress Jada Pinkett Smith came up with the concept inspired by the 1985 film Mad Max Beyond Thunderdome. She was expected to direct the video, but she removed herself from the project and was replaced by Hype Williams. The video was filmed November 10-13, 1995 in El Mirage, California.  It takes place in a desert in the year 2095. The casting includes actor Clifton Powell as the evil tribal chief, actor Chris Tucker (then known for his role in the 1995 film Friday), Tony Cox as the dwarf soldier, and Roger Troutman (formerly with the band Zapp) carrying a talk box. It ends with a cliffhanger cut by a "To Be Continued" closing. An alternative version, featuring the remix song re-cut, removes the final caption and features 2Pac and Dr. Dre naming West Coast towns.

The second video is based on the remix version of the song from the album All Eyez on Me and is a continuation of the video's story. The premise is that the desert scenes of the previous videos were merely a nightmare 2Pac was having. When he wakes up, he finds himself in his bed beside a young woman. He calls Dr. Dre on a cordless phone, who tells him to get over to his summer house because he's throwing a house party. The rest of the music video takes place as if it were a home video celebrating 2Pac's welcome to Death Row and features several cameos, notably Roger Troutman who is now playing the piano, and guest appearances from DJ Quik, Big Syke, Deion Sanders, Danny Boy, Nadia Cassini, Jodeci,  B-Legit and E-40. The video was shot in Compton, California.

The first video can be found on the DualDisc of All Eyez on Me and the second video can be found on Tupac: Live at the House of Blues DVD.
It also won the 1996 MOBO Award for Best Video. The music video was released in December 1995.

Accolades
"California Love" was voted the 11th best single of 1996 in the Pazz & Jop, an annual critics poll run by The Village Voice. Robert Christgau, the poll's creator, ranked it 10th in his own year-end list. The song's first video was nominated for an MTV Video Music Award for Best Rap Video in 1996. It achieved number 9 of the top 10 on MTV's 100 Greatest Videos Ever Made list in 1999. In April 2005 it reached the Bronze medal spot on MTV2 and XXL's 25 Greatest West Coast Videos. It also achieved number 1 on the French MTV's "100 Greatest Rap Music Videos" in 2006.
It went number 51 on VH1's countdown of the 100 Greatest songs of the 90s in 2007.
 The information regarding accolades attributed to California Love is adapted from Acclaimed Music.

Song versions
There are several different versions (and duration lengths) of California Love recorded and released by 2Pac.

California Love [Official/"Full" Original Track] – 6:29 (the unmodified, uncut original track, released only on promo vinyl records)
California Love [Remix/"Full" Original Track] – 6:25 (the unmodified, uncut remixed track, released on All Eyez On Me)
California Love ["Original"] – 4:45 (the "original" released track, shortened down from 6:29 to 4:45)
California Love [Short Radio Edit] – 4:01 (modified version of the cut "original" track [shorter, modified outro])
California Love [LP Instrumental] – 4:15 (instrumental version of the "original" track)
California Love [Short Remix Edit] – 4:07 (remixed version of the "original")
California Love [Remix Instrumental] – 4:12 (instrumental version of remix)

Some tracks listed above are available through iTunes and other music providers, while others are from CD discs only believed to be released in the UK. The "official/original" track can only be found on promo vinyl records or through YouTube, which is done only by Dr. Dre and Roger Troutman.

Personnel
Writer – Tupac "2Pac" Shakur (2nd Verse); James "J-Flexx" Anderson (1st verse)
Keyboards – Sean "Barney" Thomas
percussion – Carl "Butch" Small
Producer, mixing, featuring (Rap) – Dr. Dre
Vocals, talkbox – Roger Troutman
Background vocals – Danette Williams, Dorothy Coleman, Barbara Wilson
Engineer – Keston E. Wright
Engineer – Rick Clifford
Assistant Engineer: Alvin McGill
Production assistant – Larry Chatman
Video direction – Hype Williams

Charts

Weekly charts

Year-end charts

Decade-end charts

Certifications and sales

Release history

See also
 List of number-one singles in 1996 (New Zealand)
 List of number-one R&B singles of 1996 (U.S.)
 List of Hot 100 number-one singles of 1996 (U.S.)
 List of number-one singles (Sweden)
 List of number-one hits of 1996 (Italy)

References

1995 singles
1995 songs
Billboard Hot 100 number-one singles
Tupac Shakur songs
Dr. Dre songs
G-funk songs
Gangsta rap songs
Music videos directed by Hype Williams
Number-one singles in New Zealand
Number-one singles in Italy
Number-one singles in Sweden
Song recordings produced by Dr. Dre
Songs about California
Songs about Los Angeles
Songs written by Larry Troutman
Songs written by Roger Troutman
Death Row Records singles
Interscope Records singles
Songs written by Tupac Shakur
Songs written by Dr. Dre